Tamil Braille is the smallest of the Bharati braille alphabets.  (For the general system and for punctuation, see that article.)

Alphabet
Vowel letters are used rather than diacritics, and they occur after consonants in their spoken order.

The last two letters,  ṉ and  ḻ, are shared with Malayalam, but otherwise  ṉ is used for the anusvara (nasalization) in other Bharati alphabets, while  ḻ is also used in Urdu Braille but for the unrelated letter ʻayn.

Codas

See also
Tamil alphabet

References

Bharati braille alphabets
Tamil language